Ronald Mulder (born 27 February 1986) is a Dutch speed skater. He won bronze in the men's 500 metres event at the 2014 Winter Olympics in Sochi, Russia, and finished sixth in the men's 500 metres event at the 2012 World Single Distance Championships. His twin brother, Michel Mulder, is also a speed skater. Both competed in The World Games 2017 in Wroclaw, Poland representing the Netherlands in 500 metres sprint and 200 metres time trial. He competed in the 2018 Winter Olympics in the men's 500 metres event, finishing in 7th place.

Mulder is the current holder of the Dutch record on the 500 metres distance.

Personal records

See also
List of Olympic medalist families

References

External links

1986 births
Dutch male speed skaters
Speed skaters at the 2010 Winter Olympics
Speed skaters at the 2014 Winter Olympics
Speed skaters at the 2018 Winter Olympics 
Olympic speed skaters of the Netherlands
Medalists at the 2014 Winter Olympics
Olympic medalists in speed skating
Olympic bronze medalists for the Netherlands
Sportspeople from Zwolle
Dutch twins
Living people
Twin sportspeople
World Single Distances Speed Skating Championships medalists
Competitors at the 2017 World Games